This list of mines in South Africa is subsidiary to the list of mines article and lists working, defunct and future mines in the country and is organised by the primary mineral output. For practical purposes stone, marble and other quarries may be included in this list.

Chromium
Dwarsrivier mine
Thaba mine

Coal

Diamond

Big Hole
Du Toit's Pan
Finsch diamond mine
Jagersfontein Mine
Koffiefontein mine
Premier Mine
Venetia Diamond Mine
Voorspoed diamond mine

Gold
Blyvooruitzicht
Buffelsfontein mine
Burnstone mine
East Rand Mine
Free State goldfields
Kusasalethu mine
Mponeng Gold Mine
South Deep mine
TauTona Mine
Transvaal gold fields

Iron

Lead mines
Maitland Mines

Manganese
 Black Rock mine
 Gloria mine
 Kalagadi Manganese mine
 Mamatwan mine
 Middelplaats mine
 Nchwaning mine
 Wessels mine

Platinum
Afplats mine
Bafokeng mine
Bathopele mine
Bokoni mine
Dishaba mine
Imbasa mine
Impala mine
Inkosi mine
Khomanani mine
Khuseleka mine
Kroondal mine
Marula mine
Modikwa mine
Mogalakwena mine
Mototolo mine
Pandora mine
Siphumelele mine
Tamboti mine
Thembelani mine
Tumela mine
Twickenham mine
Two Rivers mine
Union North mine

Titanium platinum
Xolobeni mine

Uranium
 Beaufort West mine
 Beisa North mine
 Buffelsfontein uranium mine
 Denny Dalton mine
 Karoo mine
 Rietkuil mine
 South Deep uranium mine
 Springbok Flats mine
 Vaal River mine

South Africa
 
Mines
Mines